The Three Weeks or Bein ha-Metzarim (Hebrew: בין המצרים, "Between the Straits") (cf "dire straits") is a period of mourning commemorating the destruction of the first and second Jewish Temples. The Three Weeks start on the seventeenth day of the Jewish month of Tammuz — the fast of Shiva Asar B'Tammuz — and end on the ninth day of the Jewish month of Av — the fast of Tisha B'Av, which occurs exactly three weeks later. Both of these fasts commemorate events surrounding the destruction of the Jewish Temples and the subsequent exile of the Jews from the land of Israel. According to conventional chronology, the siege of Jerusalem by Nebuchadnezzar II occurred in 586/7 BCE, and the second siege of Jerusalem (70) by the Romans, in 70 CE.  Jewish chronology, however, traditionally places the first destruction at about 421 BCE. (See Missing years (Hebrew calendar) for more information.)

Observances
The mourning observances during the Three Weeks are divided into four levels, increasing in intensity:
From the Seventeenth of Tammuz until the end of Tammuz
From Rosh Chodesh Av until the week in which Tisha B'Av falls
The week in which Tisha B'Av falls until the Eighth of Av
Tisha B'Av itself

Standard Ashkenazic custom, or minhag, restricts the extent to which one may take a haircut, shave or listen to music, though communities and individuals vary their levels of observance of these customs. No Jewish marriages or other major celebrations are allowed during the Three Weeks, since the joy of such an event would conflict with the expected mood of mourning during this time.

Many Orthodox Jews refrain from eating meat during the Nine Days from the first of the month of Av until midday of the day after the fast of Ninth of Av, based on the tradition that the Temple burned until that time.

Time of danger
The Three Weeks are considered historically a time of misfortune, since many tragedies and calamities which befell the Jewish people are attributed to this period. These tragedies include: the breaking of the Tablets of the Law by Moses, when he saw the people worshipping the golden calf; the burning of a Sefer Torah by Apostomus during the Second Temple era; the destruction of both Temples on Tisha B'Av; the expulsion of the Jews from Spain shortly before Tisha B'Av 1492; and the outbreak of World War I shortly before Tisha B'Av 1914, which overturned many Jewish communities.

As a result, some Jews are particularly careful to avoid all dangerous situations during the Three Weeks. These include: going to dangerous places, undergoing a major operation that could be postponed until after Tisha B'Av, going on an airplane flight that could be postponed until after Tisha B'Av, and engaging in a court case if it can be postponed until after Tisha B'Av.

History
The first source for a special status of the Three Weeks—which is also the oldest extant reference to these days as Bein ha-Metzarim—is found in Eikhah Rabbathi 1.29 (Lamentations Rabbah, 4th century?). This midrash glosses Lamentations 1.3, "All [Zion's] pursuers overtook her between the straits," interpreting "straits" as "days of distress"—namely the Seventeenth of Tammuz and the Ninth of Av.

Rabbi Isaac Tyrnau (who lived in the late 14th and early 15th centuries) wrote in his book Minhagim, a record of Austrian customs, that haircuts are not taken and weddings are not celebrated during the Three Weeks. His opinion was cited as halacha by Moses Isserles in Rema on Shulchan Aruch, which is the foundation for most of current Ashkenazic practice.

Special haftarot
Special haftarot (passages from the Prophets), the "Three of Affliction" (tlat de-pur`anuta), are read in the synagogue on each Sabbath of the three weeks. These prophecies of Jeremiah and Isaiah predict the fall of Jerusalem, unlike most haftarot of the yearly cycle which reflect the theme of the day's Torah reading. 

Pesiqta de-Rav Kahana is the first source to designate the appropriate 12 selections from the Prophets, the Three of Affliction being 
"Divre Yirmeyahu", Words of Jeremiah (Jeremiah 1.1-2.3),
"Shim`u Devar Hashem" Hear the word of the LORD (Jeremiah 2.4-28), and
"Hazon Yisha`yahu" Vision of Isaiah (Isaiah 1.1-27).

The great majority of congregations use the haftarot suggested by Pesiqta de-Rav Kahana, which are not mentioned in the Talmud.  But Maimonides in his law code prescribes a slight variation of these three, and the Yemenite Jews read the haftarot that he lists.
The nine haftarot of the eight weeks following Tisha B'Av likewise were selected for their content. These are the "Seven of Consolation" (shev di-nhemta) followed by the "Two of Repentance" (tarte di-tyuvta)—which two appropriately fall between Rosh ha-Shanah and Yom Kippur; one is read on Saturday like the other special haftarot, but the other is read on the Fast of Gedaliah.

The Nine Days

According to the Mishna (Ta'anit 4:6), "from the beginning of Av, happiness is decreased." The last nine days of the three weeks—which are also the first nine days of the month of Av, culminating in the Tisha B'Av fast—constitute therefore a period of intensified mourning in the Ashkenazic custom. Many Jewish communities refrain from partaking of poultry, red meat, and wine; wearing freshly laundered clothes; and bathing in warm water. Sephardim observe many of these restrictions only from the Sunday before Tisha B'Av, dispensing with them entirely in years when Tisha B'Av falls on a Sunday. Yemenite Jews do not maintain these customs.

See also

 Events
Assyrian Siege of Jerusalem
Solomon's Temple
Babylonian captivity
Second Temple
Herod's Temple
Destruction of Jerusalem
Jewish-Roman wars
Western Wall

 Related holidays
Seventeenth of Tammuz
The Nine Days
Tisha B'Av

References

External links
The Three Weeks Guide (aish.com)
The Three Weeks Guide (Chabad.org)
The Three Weeks Halacha Database (Shulchanaruchharav.com)
Atzvus, Yeiush and the Three Weeks- Shiratmiriam.com

 
Tammuz (Hebrew month) observances
Tabernacle and Temples in Jerusalem
Av observances